The 2017 New Orleans Bowl was a college football bowl game played on December 16, 2017, at the Mercedes-Benz Superdome in New Orleans, Louisiana, United States.  The 17th edition of the New Orleans Bowl featured the Sun Belt Conference co-champion Troy Trojans against the Conference USA West Division champion North Texas Mean Green.  It began at 1 P.M. EST and aired on ESPN.  It was one of the 2017–18 bowl games that concluded the 2017 FBS football season.  Sponsored by freight company R+L Carriers, the game was officially known as the R+L Carriers New Orleans Bowl.  Troy defeated North Texas, 50–30.

Teams
The game featured the Troy Trojans against the North Texas Mean Green.  It was the eleventh all-time meeting between the schools; with Troy's victory, it now leads the series 9–2.  The Trojans and Mean Green played together in the Sun Belt from 2004 until 2012, when North Texas joined Conference USA.

Troy Trojans

This was the Trojans' fourth New Orleans Bowl; their record in the game is now 2–2, as they previously won the 2006 and 2010 editions of the game and lost in 2008.

North Texas Mean Green

This was the Mean Green's fifth New Orleans Bowl, moving them into a two-way tie with Southern Miss for most appearances in that game (not counting Louisiana–Lafayette's two vacated bowl wins).  The Mean Green's New Orleans Bowl record is now 1–4, with their only win in the game coming in 2002 over Cincinnati.  It was the Mean Green's first New Orleans Bowl as a representative of Conference USA; their four previous appearances had all been as a Sun Belt member. The Mean Green went 9–3 overall (7–1 in conference) in the regular season, losing to SMU (54–32), Iowa (31–14), and FAU (69–31). They lost again to FAU (41–17) in the C-USA title game to bring their record to 9–4 (7–2).

Game summary
On Troy's 1st drive, they faced an early third down. QB Brandon Silvers found Damion Willis for the first down. Later in the drive, Silvers found Willis for a beautiful pass-and-catch and found Sam Letton down to the North Texas 1-yard line. Senior RB Josh Anderson scored from a yard out to give Troy a 7–0 lead. On North Texas' second play from scrimmage, Jamal Stadom sacked QB Mason Fine and forced a fumble which Troy recovered at the 14-yard line. It took Troy just two plays to score as Silvers found Willis for 8 yards, and Anderson scored again from 2 yards out. Troy went for a two-point conversion, and Silvers found John Johnson in the back of the end zone for a 15–0 lead. Troy forced a three-and-out and got the ball back. However, on third-and-7, Joshua Wheeler sacked Silvers and Troy had to punt to North Texas. Mason Fine led a drive in which he found Rico Bussey for a 12-yard TD. Brandon Silvers then led a drive in which he found Damion Willis for a 22–7 lead.

Scoring summary

Statistics

References

2017–18 NCAA football bowl games
2017
2017
2017
2017 in sports in Louisiana
December 2017 sports events in the United States